The Border Patrol Search, Trauma, and Rescue Unit (BORSTAR) is a specialized unit of the United States Border Patrol trained in emergency search and rescue and medical response. It primarily assists injured or stranded migrants who enter the United States illegally from Mexico at remote desert locations.

The BORSTAR national headquarters is in El Paso, Texas, and units are stationed in each southwest Border Patrol sector. In 2007, BORSTAR was placed under the command of the newly formed Special Operations Group together with the Border Patrol Tactical Unit (BORTAC).

History

Officials in the Border Patrol's San Diego Sector asked for permission to start a rescue team to help agents and civilians who needed assistance.  BORSTAR was created in 1998 in response to the growing number of migrant deaths along the Mexico–United States border.

In 1999, a BORSTAR training academy opened in Tucson, Arizona, and in 2001, the unit added rescue dogs.

Training
BORSTAR is composed of volunteer agents from the U.S. Border Patrol.  After serving two years, agents may apply to attend the five-week training course.  BORSTAR members learn rescue techniques, land navigation, communications, teamwork, tactical medicine, swiftwater rescue, and air operations.  They also obtain their basic-level certification as an Emergency Medical Technician.  Some members receive additional specialized training which may include watercraft rescue, boat operations, cold weather operations, paramedic training, and SCUBA diving.

Scope of operations
In addition to assisting migrants, BORSTAR units have helped hikers, motorists, and other Border Patrol agents in need of rescue.  BORSTAR units have responded to FEMA requests for assistance, including Hurricane Katrina rescue operations.

The Border Patrol states that "situations vary in difficulty from simply locating victims and providing them with water to complex rescues requiring agents to rappel into remote canyons to assist victims and extract them by helicopter."

References

External links

 BORSTAR

Emergency services in the United States
1998 establishments in the United States
United States Border Patrol
Border Patrol